Varpa is an outdoor game that dates back to the Viking Age and survived in Gotland. It is similar to boules and horseshoes but is played with a flat and heavy object called a "varpa" instead of balls. Varpas used to be well-shaped stones, but nowadays, aluminium is more popular. The object of the game is to throw the varpa as close to a stick as possible. The game can be played individually or in teams.

No official nationally sponsored varpa teams exist; however, unofficial leagues are growing in popularity among youth in suburban areas of Sweden and Norway.

"Varpa" is an old word which simply means "to throw".

Varpa is one of the disciplines at the annual Stånga Games (Stångaspelen).

See also 
 Caber toss
 Game of physical skill
 Pärk

References 

Games of physical skill
Gotland